The 1891 Indiana Hoosiers football team was an American football team that represented Indiana University Bloomington during the 1891 college football season. In Indiana's fourth season of intercollegiate football, Billy Herod served as the school's football coach. Indiana played six games and compiled a 1–5 record. The team's 30–0 victory over the Louisville Athletic Club was the first in the history of the Indiana University football program.

Schedule

References

Indiana
Indiana Hoosiers football seasons
Indiana Hoosiers football